The 1981 Avon Championships of Kansas  was a women's tennis tournament played on indoor carpet courts at the Municipal Auditorium  in Kansas City, Missouri in the United States that was part of the 1981 Virginia Slims World Championship Series. It was the third edition of the tournament and was held from January 12 through January 18, 1981. Second-seeded Andrea Jaeger won the singles title and earned $30,000 first-prize money.

Finals

Singles

 Andrea Jaeger defeated  Martina Navratilova 3–6, 6–3, 7–5
 It was Jaeger's 1st singles title of the year and the 5th of her career.

Doubles
 Barbara Potter /  Sharon Walsh defeated  Rosemary Casals /  Wendy Turnbull 6–2, 7–6(7–4)

Prize money

References

External links
 International Tennis Federation (ITF) tournament edition details

Avon Championships of Kansas
Virginia Slims of Kansas 
Avon Championships of Kansas
Avon Championships of Kansas
Avon Championships of Kansas